The year 1999 in film included Stanley Kubrick's final film Eyes Wide Shut, Pedro Almodóvar's first Oscar-winning film All About My Mother, the science-fiction hit The Matrix, the animated works The Iron Giant, South Park: Bigger, Longer & Uncut and My Neighbors the Yamadas, the Best Picture-winner American Beauty, the well-received The Green Mile, the Pixar sequel film Toy Story 2, and the Deep Canvas-pioneering Disney animated feature Tarzan. Other noteworthy releases include M. Night Shyamalan's breakout film The Sixth Sense, the controversial cult classic Fight Club and Paul Thomas Anderson's Magnolia. The year also featured George Lucas' top-grossing Star Wars: Episode I – The Phantom Menace. Columbia Pictures and Metro-Goldwyn-Mayer celebrated their 75th anniversaries in 1999.

Highest-grossing films

The top 10 films released in 1999 by worldwide gross are as follows:

Awards

1999 wide-release films

January–March

April–June

July–September

October–December

Notable films released in 1999
United States unless stated

#
 10 Things I Hate About You, directed by Gil Junger, starring Heath Ledger, Julia Stiles, Larisa Oleynik and Joseph Gordon-Levitt
 The 13th Warrior, directed by John McTiernan, starring Antonio Banderas
 200 Cigarettes, starring Ben Affleck, Casey Affleck, Dave Chappelle, Kate Hudson, Paul Rudd and Christina Ricci
 6ixtynin9 (Ruang Talok 69) (Thailand)
 8mm, directed by Joel Schumacher, starring Nicolas Cage, Joaquin Phoenix and James Gandolfini

A
 The Adventures of Elmo in Grouchland
 After Life (ワンダフルライフ) (Japan)
 After the Rain (Ame agaru), directed by Takashi Koizumi (Japan)
 After Stonewall
 Aik Aur Love Story (One More Love Story) (Pakistan)
 Aimée & Jaguar (Germany)
 Alegría
 All About My Mother (Todo sobre mi madre), directed by Pedro Almodóvar, starring Cecilia Roth, Marisa Paredes and Penélope Cruz (Spain) – Oscar, BAFTA and Golden Globe for best foreign film
 All the Little Animals, directed by Jeremy Thomas, starring John Hurt and Christian Bale (U.K.)
 The Amateur (Argentina)
 Ambush (Rukajärven tie) (Finland)
 American Beauty, directed by Sam Mendes, starring Annette Bening, Kevin Spacey, Wes Bentley, Thora Birch, Mena Suvari, Peter Gallagher and Chris Cooper
 American Pie, directed by Paul and Chris Weitz, starring Jason Biggs, Chris Klein, Eugene Levy, Alyson Hannigan and Seann William Scott
 Analyze This, directed by Harold Ramis, starring Robert De Niro, Billy Crystal and Lisa Kudrow
 Angela's Ashes, directed by Alan Parker, starring Emily Watson and Robert Carlyle (Ireland/United States)
 Angel's Dance, starring James Belushi
 Anna and the King, starring Jodie Foster and Chow Yun-fat
 Annie, directed by Rob Marshall, starring Kathy Bates, Victor Garber, Audra McDonald and Alan Cumming
 Any Given Sunday, directed by Oliver Stone, starring Al Pacino, Jamie Foxx, Cameron Diaz, Dennis Quaid, James Woods, LL Cool J and Matthew Modine
 Anywhere but Here, starring Susan Sarandon and Natalie Portman
 Arlington Road, starring Jeff Bridges, Tim Robbins, Joan Cusack and Hope Davis
 Ashes to Ashes (U.K.)
 Asterix and Obelix Take on Caesar
 The Astronaut's Wife, starring Johnny Depp and Charlize Theron
 At First Sight, starring Val Kilmer and Mira Sorvino
 Attack the Gas Station (Juyuso seubgyuksageun) (South Korea)
 Audition (Ôdishon), directed by Takashi Miike (Japan)
 Austin Powers: The Spy Who Shagged Me, directed by Jay Roach, starring Mike Myers, Heather Graham, Seth Green and Rob Lowe

B
 Babar: King of the Elephants (Canada)
 Baby Geniuses, starring Kathleen Turner and Christopher Lloyd
 The Bachelor, starring Chris O'Donnell and Renée Zellweger
 Back to the '50s
 Bangkok Dangerous, directed by the Pang Brothers (Thailand)
 Beau Travail (Good Work), directed by Claire Denis, starring Denis Lavant (France)
 Beautiful People (U.K.)
 Being John Malkovich, directed by Spike Jonze, starring John Cusack, Cameron Diaz, Catherine Keener, John Malkovich and Charlie Sheen
 Beresina, or the Last Days of Switzerland (Beresina oder Die letzten Tage der Schweiz) (Switzerland)
 Best Laid Plans, starring Reese Witherspoon
 The Best Man, starring Taye Diggs and Nia Long
 Better Than Chocolate (Canada)
 Beyond the Mat, a documentary on professional wrestling
 Bicentennial Man, directed by Chris Columbus, starring Robin Williams, Sam Neill, Embeth Davidtz and Oliver Platt
 Big Daddy, directed by Dennis Dugan, starring Adam Sandler, Cole Sprouse, Dylan Sprouse, Joey Lauren Adams and Rob Schneider
 The Big Kahuna, starring Kevin Spacey, Danny DeVito and Peter Facinelli
 Black and White, directed by James Toback, starring Robert Downey Jr., Brooke Shields, Gaby Hoffmann and Claudia Schiffer
 The Blair Witch Project, directed by Daniel Myrick and Eduardo Sánchez, starring Heather Donahue
 Blast from the Past, directed by Hugh Wilson, starring Brendan Fraser, Alicia Silverstone, Christopher Walken, Sissy Spacek, and Dave Foley
 Blue Streak, starring Martin Lawrence and Luke Wilson
 The Bone Collector, directed by Phillip Noyce, starring Denzel Washington and Angelina Jolie
 The Boondock Saints, starring Sean Patrick Flanery, Norman Reedus, Willem Dafoe and Billy Connolly
 Bowfinger, directed by Frank Oz, starring Steve Martin, Eddie Murphy, Heather Graham, Christine Baranski, Terence Stamp and Robert Downey Jr.
 Boys Don't Cry, directed by Kimberly Peirce, starring Hilary Swank, Chloë Sevigny and Peter Sarsgaard
 Breakfast of Champions, directed by Alan Rudolph, starring Bruce Willis, Nick Nolte, Albert Finney and Barbara Hershey
 Bringing Out the Dead, directed by Martin Scorsese, starring Nicolas Cage, Patricia Arquette, John Goodman, Tom Sizemore and Ving Rhames
 Brokedown Palace, starring Claire Danes and Kate Beckinsale
 Buena Vista Social Club, a musical documentary directed by Wim Wenders (Germany/Cuba/US/UK/France)
 But I'm a Cheerleader
 Butterfly's Tongue (La lengua de las mariposas) (Spain)
 Bye Bye Africa (Daratt) (Chad)
 Bye Bye Bluebird (Faroe Islands/Denmark)

C
 El Chacotero Sentimental: la película (The Sentimental Teaser) (Chile)
 Charisma (Karisuma), directed by Kiyoshi Kurosawa (Japan)
 Chill Factor, starring Cuba Gooding Jr. and Skeet Ulrich
 Chuck E. Cheese in the Galaxy 5000, directed by David Orr
 Chutney Popcorn
 The Cider House Rules, directed by Lasse Hallström, starring Tobey Maguire, Charlize Theron, Michael Caine and Paul Rudd
 The Color of Lies (Au cœur du mensonge), directed by Claude Chabrol (France)
 The Color of Paradise (Rang-e Khoda), directed by Majid Majidi (Iran)
 The Corruptor, starring Chow Yun-fat and Mark Wahlberg
 Cosy Dens (Pelíšky) (Czech Republic)
 Cradle Will Rock, directed by Tim Robbins, starring Hank Azaria, Joan Cusack, John Cusack, Susan Sarandon, Emily Watson and Bill Murray
 Crane World (Mundo grúa) (Argentina)
 Crazy in Alabama, directed by Antonio Banderas, starring Melanie Griffith
 The Criminal, starring Steven Mackintosh and Eddie Izzard (U.K.)
 The Crimson Code, starring Patrick Muldoon, C. Thomas Howell, Fred Ward and Cathy Moriarty
 Cruel Intentions, starring Sarah Michelle Gellar, Ryan Phillippe, Reese Witherspoon and Selma Blair
 The Cup (Phörpa) (Bhutan/Australia)
 Curtain Call, starring James Spader, Polly Walker, Michael Caine and Maggie Smith

D
 Dead or Alive: Hanzaisha, directed by Takashi Miike (Japan)
 The Debt Collector, starring Billy Connolly (U.K.)
 Deep Blue Sea, directed by Renny Harlin, starring Saffron Burrows, Thomas Jane, Samuel L. Jackson, Stellan Skarsgård and LL Cool J
 The Deep End of the Ocean, starring Michelle Pfeiffer and Treat Williams
 Detroit Rock City, starring Edward Furlong
 Deuce Bigalow: Male Gigolo, starring Rob Schneider, William Forsythe, Eddie Griffin and Amy Poehler
 Deveeri (My Sister), directed by Kavitha Lankesh (India)
 The Devil's Arithmetic
 Dick, starring Kirsten Dunst, Michelle Williams and Dan Hedaya
 Dill Scallion
 A Dog of Flanders, starring Jack Warden and Jon Voight
 Dogma, directed by Kevin Smith, starring Ben Affleck, Matt Damon, Chris Rock, Linda Fiorentino, Salma Hayek, Alan Rickman and Jason Lee
 Don't Look Back (Doko made mo ikō) (Japan)
 Double Jeopardy, starring Ashley Judd and Tommy Lee Jones
 Drop Dead Gorgeous, starring Kirstie Alley, Ellen Barkin, Kirsten Dunst and Denise Richards
 Dudley Do-Right, directed by Hugh Wilson, starring Brendan Fraser, Sarah Jessica Parker, Alfred Molina and Eric Idle

E
 East is East, starring Om Puri, Linda Bassett and Jimi Mistry (U.K.)
 East/West (Восток-Запад), starring Sandrine Bonnaire and Catherine Deneuve (Russia/France/Bulgaria/Spain/Ukraine)
 EDtv, directed by Ron Howard, starring Matthew McConaughey, Woody Harrelson, Jenna Elfman, Elizabeth Hurley, Ellen DeGeneres and Dennis Hopper
 Election, directed by Alexander Payne, starring Matthew Broderick, Reese Witherspoon, Chris Klein and Jessica Campbell
 El Intruso (The Intruder) (Colombia)
 The Emperor and the Assassin (Jing Ke ci Qin Wang), directed by Chen Kaige, starring Gong Li (China)
 The End of the Affair, directed by Neil Jordan, starring Ralph Fiennes, Julianne Moore, Stephen Rea and Ian Hart (UK/US)
 End of Days, starring Arnold Schwarzenegger, Gabriel Byrne and Robin Tunney
 Entrapment, starring Sean Connery and Catherine Zeta-Jones
 Entropy, starring Stephen Dorff
 eXistenZ, directed by David Cronenberg, starring Jennifer Jason Leigh, Jude Law, Willem Dafoe, Ian Holm, Christopher Eccleston and Sarah Polley (Canada/U.K.)
 Eye of the Beholder, starring Ewan McGregor and Ashley Judd
 Eyes Wide Shut, directed by Stanley Kubrick, starring Tom Cruise, Nicole Kidman, Sydney Pollack, Marie Richardson and Todd Field (UK/US)

F
 Faeries, featuring the voices of Kate Winslet and Jeremy Irons (U.K.)
 Fantasia 2000, starring Steve Martin, Bette Midler, David Prowse, Quincy Jones, and Angela Lansbury
 Farewell, Home Sweet Home (Adieu, plancher des vaches!) (France)
 Felicia's Journey, starring Bob Hoskins (U.K.)
 Fight Club, directed by David Fincher, starring Brad Pitt, Edward Norton, Helena Bonham Carter and Meat Loaf Aday
 The Five Senses (Canada)
 Flawless, directed by Joel Schumacher, starring Robert De Niro and Philip Seymour Hoffman
 The Florentine, starring Virginia Madsen, Michael Madsen, Chris Penn and Hal Holbrook
 A Force More Powerful
 For Love of the Game, directed by Sam Raimi, starring Kevin Costner, Kelly Preston, John C. Reilly, Brian Cox and Vin Scully
 Forces of Nature, starring Ben Affleck, Sandra Bullock and Maura Tierney
 Free Enterprise, starring Eric McCormack, William Shatner and Rafer Weigel
 Friends & Lovers, starring Stephen Baldwin, Claudia Schiffer and Robert Downey Jr.

G
 Galaxy Quest, starring Tim Allen, Sigourney Weaver, Alan Rickman, Tony Shalhoub, Sam Rockwell, and Daryl Mitchell
 Gamera 3: The Revenge of Iris (Gamera Surī Jyashin Irisu Kakusei) (Japan)
 Garage Olimpo (Olympic Garage) (Argentina)
 The Geisha House (Omocha) (Japan)
 Gemini (Sôseiji) (Japan)
 The General's Daughter, directed by Simon West, starring John Travolta, Madeleine Stowe, Timothy Hutton, James Cromwell and James Woods
 Genesis (La genèse) (France-Mali)
 Ghost Dog: The Way of the Samurai, directed by Jim Jarmusch, starring Forest Whitaker
 Ghost in Love (Jagwimo) (South Korea)
 Girl, Interrupted, directed by James Mangold, starring Winona Ryder, Angelina Jolie, Brittany Murphy, Whoopi Goldberg and Vanessa Redgrave
 Girl on the Bridge (La fille sur le pont), directed by Patrice Leconte, starring Daniel Auteuil and Vanessa Paradis (France)
 Gloria, directed by Sidney Lumet, starring Sharon Stone, Jeremy Northam and George C. Scott
 Glue Sniffer (Huelepega: Ley de la calle) (Venezuela/Spain)
 Go, directed by Doug Liman, starring William Fichtner, Katie Holmes, Jay Mohr, Sarah Polley, Scott Wolf, Taye Diggs and Timothy Olyphant
 God's Wedding (As Bodas de Deus) (Portugal)
 Godzilla 2000: Millennium (Gojira Nisen: Mireniamu) (Japan)
 Goya in Bordeaux (Goya en Burdeos), directed by Carlos Saura (Spain)
 The Green Mile, directed by Frank Darabont, starring Tom Hanks, David Morse, Michael Clarke Duncan, Patricia Clarkson, Bonnie Hunt, and James Cromwell
 Gregory's Two Girls, directed by Bill Forsyth, starring John Gordon Sinclair, Maria Doyle Kennedy and Dougray Scott (U.K.)
 Grey Owl, directed by Richard Attenborough, starring Pierce Brosnan (U.K./Canada)
 Guinevere, starring Stephen Rea, Sarah Polley and Jean Smart

H
 Happy End (South Korea)
 The Harmonium in My Memory (Nae Maeumui Pongkeum) (South Korea)
 The Haunting, directed by Jan de Bont, starring Liam Neeson, Catherine Zeta-Jones, Lili Taylor and Owen Wilson
 Held Up, starring Jamie Foxx and Nia Long
 Herod's Law (La ley de Herodes), starring Damián Alcázar and Pedro Armendáriz Jr. (Mexico)
 The Hi-Line, starring Rachael Leigh Cook
 Holy Smoke!, directed by Jane Campion, starring Kate Winslet, Harvey Keitel and Pam Grier (Australia)
 House on Haunted Hill, starring Geoffrey Rush, Famke Janssen, Taye Diggs, Ali Larter and Peter Gallagher
 Hum Dil De Chuke Sanam (I Have Already Given My Heart, Darling) (India)
 Human Traffic, starring John Simm, Lorraine Pilkington and Danny Dyer (U.K.)
 Humanité (France)
 The Hurricane, directed by Norman Jewison, starring Denzel Washington – a biopic of boxer Rubin "Hurricane" Carter

I
 I Will Survive (Sobreviviré) (Spain)
 An Ideal Husband, directed by Oliver Parker, starring Cate Blanchett, Jeremy Northam, Rupert Everett, Julianne Moore and Minnie Driver (U.K.)
 Idle Hands, starring Devon Sawa, Jessica Alba
 In China They Eat Dogs (I Kina Spiser de Hunde) (Denmark)
 In Dreams, directed by Neil Jordan, starring Annette Bening, Aidan Quinn and Robert Downey Jr.
 In Too Deep, starring Omar Epps and LL Cool J
 The Insider, directed by Michael Mann, starring Russell Crowe, Al Pacino, Christopher Plummer, Philip Baker Hall, Diane Venora and Debi Mazar
 Inspector Gadget, directed by David Kellogg, starring Matthew Broderick, Rupert Everett, Joely Fisher, Michelle Trachtenberg and Dabney Coleman
 Instinct, starring Anthony Hopkins and Cuba Gooding Jr.
 It All Starts Today (Ça commence aujourd'hui), directed by Bertrand Tavernier (France)

J
 Jackie Chan: My Stunts, a documentary directed by and starring Jackie Chan (Hong Kong)
 Jakob the Liar, directed by Peter Kassovitz, starring Robin Williams, Alan Arkin, Liev Schreiber, Hannah Taylor-Gordon and Bob Balaban
 Jawbreaker, starring Rose McGowan, Rebecca Gayheart, Julie Benz and Judy Greer
 Jesus' Son, starring Billy Crudup, Denis Leary and Holly Hunter (Canada/United States)
 Jin-Roh: The Wolf Brigade (Japan)
 Joe the King, starring Val Kilmer
 Joseph and the Amazing Technicolor Dreamcoat
 Journey to the Sun (Güneşe Yolculuk) (Turkey)
 Juha, directed by Aki Kaurismäki (Finland)
 Just a Little Harmless Sex, starring Alison Eastwood and Lauren Hutton
 Just the Ticket, starring Andy García

K
 K-911, starring James Belushi
 Kadosh (Sacred) (Israel)
 Karnaval (Carnival) (France)
 Kikujiro (Kikujirō no Natsu), directed by Takeshi Kitano (Japan)
 The King and I, animated film featuring voices of Miranda Richardson and Darrell Hammond
 King of Comedy (Hei kek ji wong) (Hong Kong)
 Kiss the Sky, starring William Petersen, Sheryl Lee and Gary Cole
 Kiss Toledo Goodbye, starring Christopher Walken

L
 Lake Placid, starring Bill Pullman, Bridget Fonda, Oliver Platt, Brendan Gleeson and Betty White
 Lansky, starring Richard Dreyfuss
 Larry-Boy and the Rumor Weed
 The Law of Enclosures (Canada)
 The Letter (La Lettre / A Carta), directed by Manoel de Oliveira (France/Portugal)
 Liberty Heights, directed by Barry Levinson, starring Adrien Brody, Bebe Neuwirth, Orlando Jones, Ben Foster and Joe Mantegna
 Life, directed by Ted Demme, starring Eddie Murphy, Martin Lawrence, Bernie Mac and Ned Beatty
 Light It Up, starring Usher Raymond and Forest Whitaker
 Limbo, directed by John Sayles, starring Mary Elizabeth Mastrantonio, David Strathairn and Kris Kristofferson
 The Limey, directed by Steven Soderbergh, starring Terence Stamp, Peter Fonda, Lesley Ann Warren, Luis Guzmán and Barry Newman
 The Loss of Sexual Innocence, directed by Mike Figgis, starring Julian Sands, Saffron Burrows and Gina McKee (UK/US)
 Lost & Found, starring David Spade and Sophie Marceau
 The Love Letter, starring Kate Capshaw, Ellen DeGeneres, Tom Everett Scott and Tom Selleck
 Love Stinks, starring French Stewart and Bridgette Wilson
 Love Wind Love Song (Yeonpung yeonga) (South Korea)
 Luna Papa (Lunnyy papa) (Russia)

M
 Magnolia, directed by Paul Thomas Anderson, starring Tom Cruise, Julianne Moore, John C. Reilly, William H. Macy, Philip Baker Hall, Philip Seymour Hoffman, Jeremy Blackman, Melora Walters, Melinda Dillon, Ricky Jay, Alfred Molina, Michael Murphy and Jason Robards
 Man of the Century
 Man on the Moon, directed by Miloš Forman, starring Jim Carrey, Courtney Love, Danny DeVito and Paul Giamatti
 Mansfield Park, starring Frances O'Connor and James Purefoy (U.K.)
 A Map of the World, starring Sigourney Weaver
 Marshal Tito's Spirit (Maršal) (Croatia)
 The Mating Habits of the Earthbound Human, starring Carmen Electra
 The Matrix, directed by the Wachowskis, starring Keanu Reeves, Laurence Fishburne, Carrie-Anne Moss, Hugo Weaving, and Joe Pantoliano
 Memento Mori (Yeogogoedam dubeonjjae iyagi) (South Korea)
 Message in a Bottle, starring Kevin Costner, Robin Wright Penn, Paul Newman, John Savage, Robbie Coltrane and Illeana Douglas
 The Messenger: The Story of Joan of Arc (Jeanne d'Arc), directed by Luc Besson, starring Milla Jovovich, John Malkovich, Faye Dunaway and Dustin Hoffman (France)
 Mickey Blue Eyes, starring Hugh Grant, James Caan and Jeanne Tripplehorn
 A Midsummer Night's Dream, directed by Michael Hoffman, starring Kevin Kline, Michelle Pfeiffer, Rupert Everett, Stanley Tucci, Calista Flockhart and Christian Bale (UK/US)
 Mifune's Last Song (Mifunes sidste sang) (Denmark)
 The Minus Man, directed by Hampton Fancher, starring Owen Wilson, Brian Cox, Sheryl Crow, Janeane Garofalo and Mercedes Ruehl
 Miss Julie, starring Saffron Burrows and Peter Mullan (UK/US)
 The Mod Squad, starring Claire Danes, Omar Epps, Giovanni Ribisi and Dennis Farina
 Moloch, directed by Alexander Sokurov (Russia)
 Molokai: The Story of Father Damien, starring David Wenham and Peter O'Toole (Belgium)
 Monkeybone, directed by Henry Selick, starring Brendan Fraser, Bridget Fonda and Whoopi Goldberg with the voice of John Turturro
 Moonlight Whispers (Sasayaki) (Japan)
 Mumford, directed by Lawrence Kasdan, starring Loren Dean, Hope Davis, Mary McDonnell, Alfre Woodard and Jason Lee
 The Mummy, directed by Stephen Sommers, starring Brendan Fraser, Rachel Weisz, John Hannah, Kevin J. O'Connor and Arnold Vosloo
 Muppets from Space, starring Jeffrey Tambor, Rob Schneider and Andie MacDowell, with the voices of Steve Whitmire, Dave Goelz and Frank Oz
 The Muse, directed by and starring Albert Brooks, with Sharon Stone, Andie MacDowell and Jeff Bridges
 Music of the Heart, directed by Wes Craven, starring Meryl Streep, Aidan Quinn, Angela Bassett and Gloria Estefan
 My Life So Far, directed by Hugh Hudson, starring Colin Firth, Rosemary Harris, Irène Jacob and Malcolm McDowell (U.K.)
 My Voyage to Italy (Il mio viaggio in Italia), a documentary directed by Martin Scorsese (United States/Italy)
 Mystery, Alaska, directed by Jay Roach, starring Russell Crowe, Hank Azaria, Mary McCormack and Burt Reynolds
 Mystery Men, starring Ben Stiller, William H. Macy, Janeane Garofalo, Hank Azaria, Greg Kinnear, Paul Reubens and Geoffrey Rush

N
 Nang Nak (Thailand)
 The Nanny (La Balia) (Italy)
 Never Been Kissed, starring Drew Barrymore and David Arquette
 New Waterford Girl (Canada)
 Nightshapes (Nachtgestalten) (Germany)
 The Ninth Gate, directed by Roman Polanski, starring Johnny Depp, Lena Olin, Emmanuelle Seigner and Frank Langella (United States/Spain/France)
 No One Writes to the Colonel (El coronel no tiene quien le escriba), starring Fernando Luján, Marisa Paredes and Salma Hayek (Mexico)
 No Trains No Planes (Netherlands)
 Northern Skirts (Nordrand) (Austria)
 Not of this World (Fuori Dal Mondo) (Italy)
 Not One Less (Yi ge dou bu neng shao), directed by Zhang Yimou (China)
 Notting Hill, directed by Roger Michell, starring Julia Roberts, Hugh Grant, Tim McInnerny, Gina McKee, Hugh Bonneville and Rhys Ifans (U.K.)
 Nowhere to Hide (Injeong sajeong bol geot eobtda) (South Korea)

O
 Office Space, directed by Mike Judge, starring Ron Livingston, Gary Cole, Stephen Root, John C. McGinley and Jennifer Aniston
 The Old Man and the Sea (Старик и море) (Russia/Japan/Canada)
 The Omega Code, starring Casper Van Dien, Michael York, Michael Ironside and Catherine Oxenberg
 The One and Only (Den Eneste Ene) (Denmark)
 One Man's Hero, starring Tom Berenger
 Onegin, starring Ralph Fiennes, Liv Tyler and Irene Worth (UK/US)
 Operation Grandma (Mivtza Savta) (Israel)
 Ordinary Heroes (Qian yan wan yu) (Hong Kong)
 Oriundi, directed by Anthony Quinn (Brazil)
 The Other Sister, directed by Garry Marshall, starring Juliette Lewis, Diane Keaton, Giovanni Ribisi and Tom Skerritt
 Our Friend, Martin

P
 Payback, directed by Brian Helgeland, starring Mel Gibson, Gregg Henry, Maria Bello, William Devane, James Coburn and Lucy Liu
 Pitch People
 Play It to the Bone, directed by Ron Shelton, starring Woody Harrelson, Antonio Banderas, Lolita Davidovich and Lucy Liu
 Pola X, starring Guillaume Depardieu, Yekaterina Golubeva and Catherine Deneuve (France/Switzerland/Germany/Japan)
 Poppoya (Railroad Man), starring Ken Takakura (Japan)
 Postmen in the Mountains (Nàshān nàrén nàgǒu) (China)
 The Power of Kangwon Province (Gangwon-do ui him) (South Korea)
 Propaganda (Turkey)
 Pushing Tin, directed by Mike Newell, starring John Cusack, Billy Bob Thornton, Cate Blanchett and Angelina Jolie

R
 Random Hearts, directed by Sydney Pollack, starring Harrison Ford, Kristin Scott Thomas, Bonnie Hunt and Charles S. Dutton
 Ratcatcher, directed by Lynne Ramsay (U.K.)
 Ravenous, directed by Antonia Bird starring Guy Pearce, Robert Carlyle, Jeremy Davies and David Arquette (Czech Republic/UK/US)
 Return of the Idiot (Návrat idiota) (Czech Republic)
 Rites of Passage, starring Dean Stockwell and James Remar
 The Road Home (wǒde fùqin mǔqin), directed by Zhang Yimou (China)
 Rodents (Ratas, Ratones, Rateros) (Ecuador)
 Rogue Trader, starring Ewan McGregor, Anna Friel and Tim McInnerny (U.K.)
 Romance X – France
 A Room for Romeo Brass, directed by Shane Meadows, starring Andrew Shim, Paddy Considine and Bob Hoskins (U.K.)
 Rosetta, directed by Jean-Pierre Dardenne and Luc Dardenne (France/Belgium)
 Run for Money (Kaç para kaç) (Turkey)
 Runaway Bride, directed by Garry Marshall, starring Julia Roberts and Richard Gere
 The Runner, starring Ron Eldard and Courteney Cox

S
 Same Love, Same Rain (El mismo amor, la misma lluvia) (Argentina)
 Sarfarosh (Martyr), starring Aamir Khan (India)
 See You in Hell, My Darling (Θα σε Δω στην Κόλαση Αγάπη μου) (Greece)
 Set Me Free (Emporte-Moi) (Canada/France/Switzerland)
 Seventeen Years (guò nián huí jiā), directed by Zhang Yuan (China)
 Sexo, pudor y lágrimas (Sex, Shame and Tears) (Mexico)
 Shaheed-E-Mohabbat (India)
 Shark Skin Man and Peach Hip Girl (Samehada Otoko to Momojiri Onna) (Japan)
 She's All That, starring Freddie Prinze Jr. and Rachael Leigh Cook
 Shiri (South Korea)
 Shower (Xizao) (China)
 Sicilia! (Sicily) (Italy)
 Simon Magus, starring Stuart Townsend (U.K.)
 Simpatico, starring Jeff Bridges, Sharon Stone, Nick Nolte, Catherine Keener and Albert Finney
 Simply Irresistible, starring Sarah Michelle Gellar and Sean Patrick Flanery
 The Sixth Sense, directed by M. Night Shyamalan, starring Bruce Willis, Haley Joel Osment, Toni Collette and Olivia Williams
 Sleeping Beauties
 Sleepy Hollow, directed by Tim Burton, starring Johnny Depp, Christina Ricci, Miranda Richardson, Michael Gambon, Casper Van Dien and Christopher Walken
 A Slipping-Down Life, starring Lili Taylor and Guy Pearce
 Snow Falling on Cedars, starring Ethan Hawke
 Solas (Spain)
 Sonnenallee (Germany)
 South Park: Bigger, Longer & Uncut, directed by Trey Parker
 Speedway Junky, starring Jesse Bradford and Daryl Hannah
 The Spirit of My Mother (El Espiritu de mi Mama) (Honduras)
 Star Wars: Episode I – The Phantom Menace, directed by George Lucas, starring Liam Neeson, Ewan McGregor, Natalie Portman, Jake Lloyd and Terence Stamp
 Stigmata, starring Patricia Arquette and Gabriel Byrne
 Stir of Echoes, starring Kevin Bacon
 The Story of Us, directed by Rob Reiner, starring Bruce Willis and Michelle Pfeiffer
 The Straight Story, directed by David Lynch, starring Richard Farnsworth, Sissy Spacek and Harry Dean Stanton
 Stuart Little, starring Geena Davis, Hugh Laurie and Jonathan Lipnicki with the voices of Michael J. Fox and Nathan Lane
 Summer of Sam, directed by Spike Lee, starring John Leguizamo, Adrien Brody, Mira Sorvino, Jennifer Esposito and Anthony LaPaglia
 Sunshine (A napfény íze), directed by István Szabó, starring Ralph Fiennes, Rosemary Harris, Jennifer Ehle, Rachel Weisz and William Hurt (Hun/Austria/Germany/Canada)
 Superstar, starring Molly Shannon and Will Ferrell
 Sweet and Lowdown, directed by Woody Allen, starring Sean Penn, Uma Thurman, Samantha Morton and Anthony LaPaglia

T
 Taboo (Gohatto), directed by Nagisa Oshima, starring Ryuhei Matsuda and Beat Takeshi (Japan)
 The Talented Mr. Ripley, directed by Anthony Minghella, starring Matt Damon, Gwyneth Paltrow, Jude Law, Cate Blanchett and Philip Seymour Hoffman
 Tarzan, directed by Kevin Lima and Chris Buck, with the voices of Tony Goldwyn, Minnie Driver, Glenn Close, Brian Blessed, Nigel Hawthorne and Rosie O'Donnell
 Tea with Mussolini, directed by Franco Zeffirelli, starring Cher, Joan Plowright, Judi Dench, Maggie Smith and Lily Tomlin (U.K./Italy)
 Teaching Mrs. Tingle, starring Helen Mirren, Katie Holmes and Barry Watson
 Teen Knight
 Tell Me Something (South Korea)
 That Championship Season, starring Paul Sorvino, Vincent D'Onofrio, Gary Sinise, Terry Kinney and Tony Shalhoub
 The Thirteenth Floor, starring Craig Bierko, Armin Mueller-Stahl and Gretchen Mol (United States/Germany)
 The Thirteenth Year
 The Time Shifters
 The Thomas Crown Affair, directed by John McTiernan, starring Pierce Brosnan, Rene Russo and Denis Leary
 Three Kings, directed by David O. Russell, starring George Clooney, Mark Wahlberg, Ice Cube, Nora Dunn and Spike Jonze
 Three Seasons (Ba Mùa) (United States/Vietnam)
 Three to Tango, starring Matthew Perry, Neve Campbell and Oliver Platt
 Time at the Top
 Time Regained (Le Temps retrouvé), starring Catherine Deneuve and Emmanuelle Béart (France)
 Titus, directed by Julie Taymor, starring Anthony Hopkins, Jessica Lange, Angus Macfadyen and Alan Cumming (UK/US)
 To Walk with Lions, starring Richard Harris and Ian Bannen (U.K.)
 Topsy-Turvy, directed by Mike Leigh, starring Jim Broadbent, Allan Corduner, Lesley Manville, Shirley Henderson, Kevin McKidd and Timothy Spall (U.K.)
 Toy Story 2, directed by John Lasseter, with the voices of Tom Hanks, Tim Allen, Don Rickles, Joan Cusack and Kelsey Grammer
 Trick, starring Tori Spelling and Christian Campbell
 True Crime, directed by and starring Clint Eastwood, with Isaiah Washington, Denis Leary and James Woods
 Tube Tales, directed by Bob Hoskins, Ewan McGregor, Jude Law and others (U.K.)
 Tumbleweeds, starring Janet McTeer and Kimberly J. Brown
 Twin Falls Idaho, directorial and screenwriting debut for The Polish brothers
 Two Girls and a Guy, directed by James Toback, starring Robert Downey Jr., Heather Graham and Natasha Gregson Wagner
 Two Hands, starring Heath Ledger and Bryan Brown (Australia)
 Two Women (Do zan) (Iran)

U
 Ultraman Tiga & Ultraman Dyna & Ultraman Gaia: Battle in Hyperspace (Japan)
 Undercover Angel (Un vrai petit ange) (Canada)
 Uninvited Guest, starring Mekhi Phifer

V
 Varsity Blues, starring James Van Der Beek and Jon Voight
 Vaastav: The Reality, starring Sanjay Dutt (India)
 Victim (Mu lu xiong guang), directed by Ringo Lam, starring Tony Leung Ka-fai (Hong Kong)
 The Virgin Suicides, directed by Sofia Coppola, starring Kirsten Dunst, James Woods, Kathleen Turner, Josh Hartnett and Danny DeVito
 Virus, starring Jamie Lee Curtis, William Baldwin and Donald Sutherland

W
 Wakko's Wish
 Walking Across Egypt, starring Ellen Burstyn, Mark Hamill and Edward Herrmann
 A Walk on the Moon, starring Diane Lane, Viggo Mortensen, Liev Schreiber and Anna Paquin
 The War Zone, directed by Tim Roth, starring Ray Winstone and Tilda Swinton (U.K.)
 Whatever Happened to Harold Smith?, starring Tom Courtenay, Stephen Fry and Lulu (U.K.)
 Why Not Me? (Pourquoi pas moi?) (France)
 Wild Wild West, directed by Barry Sonnenfeld, starring Will Smith, Kevin Kline, Kenneth Branagh and Salma Hayek
 The Wind Will Carry Us (Bād mā rā khāhad bord), directed by Abbas Kiarostami (Iran)
 Wing Commander, starring Freddie Prinze Jr., Saffron Burrows and Matthew Lillard
 The Winslow Boy, directed by David Mamet, starring Nigel Hawthorne, Jeremy Northam, Rebecca Pidgeon and Gemma Jones (U.K.)
 With Fire and Sword, directed by Jerzy Hoffman (Poland)
 Wonderland, directed by Michael Winterbottom, starring Gina McKee, Shirley Henderson, Ian Hart and John Simm (U.K.)
 The Wood, starring Omar Epps
 The World Is Not Enough, directed by Michael Apted, starring Pierce Brosnan (as James Bond), Sophie Marceau, Denise Richards, Robert Carlyle and Judi Dench (U.K.)

Y
 Yana's Friends (Ha Chaverim shel Yana) (Israel)
 Yellow Hair (Norang meori) (South Korea)

Births
 January 1 - Diamond White, American actress
 January 4 - Gage Munroe, Canadian actor
 January 6 - Eliza Scanlen, Australian actress
 January 15 - Miray Daner, Turkish actress
 January 18 - Karan Brar, American actor
 February 3 - Kanna Hashimoto, Japanese actress  
 February 7 - Bea Miller, American singer, songwriter and actress
 February 10 - Tiffany Espensen, American actress
 February 19 - Sonia Ben Ammar, French model, singer and actress
 March 5 - Yeri (singer), South Korean singer and actress
 March 25
Jin Ji-hee, South Korean actress
Mikey Madison, American actress
 April 29 - Morgan Turner, American actress
 May 10 - Michael Gandolfini, American actor
 May 11 - Sabrina Carpenter, American actress
 May 25 - Brec Bassinger, American actress
 May 27 - Lily-Rose Depp, French-American actress
 May 28 - Cameron Boyce, American actor (d. 2019)
 May 30 - Sean Giambrone, American actor
 June 21 - Natalie Alyn Lind, Canadian actress
 June 26 - Harley Quinn Smith, American actress
 June 27 - Chandler Riggs, American actor
 July 9 - Claire Corlett, Canadian actress
 July 18 - Onni Tommila, Finnish actor
 July 30 - Joey King, American actress
 August 19 - Tristan Lake Leabu, American actor and musician
 August 22
 Dakota Goyo, Canadian actor
 Ricardo Hurtado, American actor and singer
 September 1 - Jadagrace, American actress, dancer, singer and rapper
 September 2 - Gavin Casalegno, American actor and model
 September 4 - Ellie Darcey-Alden, English actress
 September 7 - Michelle Creber, Canadian actress
 September 14 - Emma Kenney, American actress
 October 13 - Nell Tiger Free, English actress
 October 15 - Bailee Madison, American actress
 November 10
 Kiernan Shipka, American actress
 Michael Cimino (actor) , American actor

Deaths

Film debuts
Amy Adams - Drop Dead Gorgeous
Anthony Anderson - Life
Jay Baruchel - Running Home
Jeremy Blackman - Magnolia
Adam Brody - Random Acts of Violence
Daniel Brühl - Paradise Mall
Zooey Deschanel - Mumford
Omid Djalili - The Mummy
Idris Elba - Belle maman
James Franco - Never Been Kissed
Zach Galifianakis - Flushed
Tony Hale - Raging Hormones
Regina Hall - The Best Man
Hugh Jackman - Paperback Hero
Dakota Johnson - Crazy in Alabama
Chris Klein - Election
Ashton Kutcher - Coming Soon
Brie Larson - Special Delivery
Ali Larter - Varsity Blues
Justin Long - Galaxy Quest
Taryn Manning - Speedway Junky
Kate Mara - Random Hearts
Melissa McCarthy - Go
Bobby Moynihan - Nine the Hard Way
Emily Osment - The Secret Life of Girls
Kip Pardue - But I'm a Cheerleader
Simon Pegg - Tube Tales
Kal Penn - Freshman
Seann William Scott - American Pie
Peter Serafinowicz - Star Wars: Episode I – The Phantom Menace
Alia Shawkat - Three Kings
Audrey Tautou - Venus Beauty Institute
Gabrielle Union - She's All That
Paz Vega - Zapping
Ben Whishaw - The Trench
Rainn Wilson - Galaxy Quest

References

External links 
 1999: The Year That Changed Movies
 Best. Movie. Year. Ever. How 1999 Blew Up the Big Screen

 
Film by year